Hindi dance music encompasses a wide range of songs predominantly featured in the Bollywood film industry with a growing worldwide attraction. The music became popular among overseas Indians in places such as South Africa, Mauritius, Fiji, the Caribbean, Canada, the United Kingdom, the Netherlands and the United States of America and eventually developed a global fan base.

Recognition
While Hindi dance music forms part of the music of Bollywood, the wide-based genre songs became popular by the early-to-mid-2000s after the worldwide success of the song "Mundian To Bach Ke" which charted in various international music charts, and other famous dance songs such as "Kajra Re". By the late 2000s, Hindi dance music attained worldwide recognition following the success of the Oscar-winning song "Jai Ho". By the 2010s, due to the growing fan base of EDM, Hindi dance music began incorporating EDM, prompting the recognition of songs such as "Baby Doll". The style of music was also an influence for British singer M.I.A. and her album Matangi. Not to mention; Hindi songs are often sampled in some of today's hits and even songs from over the years; songs like "Whoopty" by CJ came from the Bollywood title song "Sanam Re", even Britney Spears' song "Toxic" came from an old school Bollywood song. Bollywood have definitely made their way around the globe.

Bollywood dance

The filmi music and dances in Bollywood films are a synthesis of formal and folk Indian traditional music and dance traditions, in fusion with Middle Eastern techniques. The dances in older Hindi movies represented supposed dances of the common people, although they involved original choreography. Bollywood dances have evolved as a unique and energetic style. Since they are group dances, they are often used as joyful exercise music. The style of dance has also highly influenced international artists and appears in songs such as "Don't Phunk with My Heart", "Come & Get It", "Legendary Lovers", "Bounce" and "Never Give Up" as well as EDM hit "Lean On", "Biba", "Goosebump" (which is soundtrack of Kung Fu Yoga) and Eurovision-winning song "Toy".

The choreography of Bollywood dances takes inspiration from Indian folk dances, classical dances (like kathak) as well as disco and from earlier Hindi filmi dances.

Hindi film choreographers
Some of the notable choreographers of past years were 
 B. Sohanlal (Sahib Bibi Aur Ghulam, Jewel Thief, Chaudhvin ka Chand)
 Lachhu Maharaj (Mahal, Pakeezah, Mughal-e-Azam)
 Chiman Seth (Mother India)
 Krishna Kumar (Awaara, Madhosh, Andaz)

Among the modern choreographers the notable are:
 Shiamak Davar (Taal, Bunty aur Babli, Dil To Pagal Hai)
 Saroj Khan (Baazigar, Soldier, Veer-Zaara)
 Ahmed Khan (Rangeela, Pardes, Mere Yaar Ki Shaadi Hai)
 Raju Khan (Lagaan, Krrish)
 Vaibhavi Merchant (Dhoom, Swades, Rang de Basanti)
 Remo (Jo Bole So Nihal, Pyaar Ke Side Effects, Waqt)
 Farah Khan (Kabhi Khushi Kabhie Gham..., Monsoon Wedding, Dil Chahta Hai)
 Piyush Bhagat and Shazia Samji "Hook Up Song" from the movie Student Of The Year 2

See also
Dance music
Bollywood songs
 Babul (Hindi word)
 Item number
 Hindi wedding songs

Notes

References
 Echoes from Dharamsala: Music in the Life of a Tibetan Refugee Community by Keila Diehl
 Music of Hindu Trinidad: Songs from the India Diaspora by Helen Myers
 Cassette Culture: Popular Music and Technology in North India by Peter Manuel
 World Music Volume 2: Latin and North America, Caribbean, India, Asia and Pacific by Simon Broughton, Mark Ellingham

Music
Dance music genres